Hoseynabad (also Romanized as Ḩoseynābād; also known as Ḩoseynābād-e Şabūrī) is a village in Beyhaq Rural District, Sheshtomad District, Sabzevar County, Razavi Khorasan Province, Iran. At the 2006 census, its population was 37, in 11 families.

References 

Populated places in Sabzevar County